Sergeant James Edgar Engle (1844 to November 19, 1897) was an American soldier who fought in the American Civil War. Engle received the country's highest award for bravery during combat, the Medal of Honor, for his action during the Bermuda Hundred Campaign in Virginia on 18 May 1864. He was honored with the award on 17 December 1896.

Biography
Engle was born in Chester, Pennsylvania in 1844. He enlisted in the 97th Pennsylvania Infantry. He died on 19 November 1897 and his remains are interred at the Arlington National Cemetery in Virginia.

Medal of Honor citation

See also

List of American Civil War Medal of Honor recipients: A–F

References

1844 births
1897 deaths
People of Pennsylvania in the American Civil War
Union Army officers
United States Army Medal of Honor recipients
American Civil War recipients of the Medal of Honor